José Julián de la Cuesta Herrera (born 10 February 1983) is a Colombian professional footballer who plays as a central defender.

Club career
Born in Medellín, de la Cuesta started playing football with local Atlético Nacional. In January 2004, after an unassuming spell in Austria and a brief return to his first club, he signed with Spain's Cádiz CF, where he would remain for the better part of the following six and a half seasons.

With the Andalusia side, de la Cuesta competed in all three major levels of Spanish football. He played 15 games in La Liga in the 2005–06 campaign, which ended in relegation; his best output consisted of 25 matches and one goal in 2007–08, with his team also dropping down a tier, now from the second division.

Released by Cádiz in the summer of 2010, de la Cuesta joined another club in the country, Albacete Balompié, having his season curtailed after suffering an anterior cruciate ligament injury to his left knee and again suffering team relegation from division two.

International career
De la Cuesta represented Colombia at the 2003 FIFA World Youth Championship in the United Arab Emirates, partnering Pablo Pachón in central defense as the national team finished third.

References

External links

Stats and bio at Cadistas1910 

Austria Wien archives 

1983 births
Living people
Footballers from Medellín
Colombian people of Spanish descent
Colombian footballers
Association football defenders
Categoría Primera A players
Atlético Nacional footballers
Independiente Santa Fe footballers
Once Caldas footballers
Deportivo Pasto footballers
Austrian Football Bundesliga players
FK Austria Wien players
La Liga players
Segunda División players
Segunda División B players
Cádiz CF players
Real Valladolid players
Albacete Balompié players
Colombia under-20 international footballers
Colombia international footballers
2005 CONCACAF Gold Cup players
Colombian expatriate footballers
Expatriate footballers in Austria
Expatriate footballers in Spain
Colombian expatriate sportspeople in Spain